James Trenchard (1747–?) was an American artist, printmaker, and engraver. He was born in Penns Neck, Salem County, New Jersey and by 1777 had moved to Philadelphia to work as an engraver. He was an illustrator for the Columbian Magazine and was its publisher from 1789 to 1790. In 1793 he emigrated to England.

Gallery

See also
 Edward Trenchard – nephew

References

1747 births
year of death unknown
18th-century engravers
American engravers
American magazine publishers (people)
Artists from Philadelphia
People from Pennsville Township, New Jersey